Robert Augustine Mollan was Dean of Clogher from 1962 until 1966.

He was educated at Trinity College, Dublin and ordained in 1922.  After  curacies in Belfast and Lisburn he held  incumbencies at Glenavy and Cairncastle  and Ballybay  until his time as Dean.

References

Irish Anglicans
Alumni of Trinity College Dublin
Deans of Clogher